The Ann Hamilton House is a historic home in Savannah, Georgia, United States. It is located at 24–26 East Bryan Street in the northeastern tything block of Johnson Square, the city's oldest square. Completed in 1824, it is now the oldest extant building on the square. It is part of the Savannah Historic District.

The home was built by Amos Scudder for Ann Hamilton.

See also 

 Buildings in Savannah Historic District

References 

Houses in Savannah, Georgia
Houses completed in 1824
Johnson Square (Savannah) buildings
Savannah Historic District